A common commercial policy is several states coordinating some or all aspects of their trade policy.

It is sometimes agreed by treaty within a customs union. In the case of the European Union, a form of the EU's common commercial policy has been in place since 1957. 

A common commercial policy is also an aim of Mercosur.

References

Commercial policy
Economic integration
International economics